HSwMS Romulus (27) was a destroyer of the Royal Swedish Navy, the name ship of her class. She was in service during World War II, and later, in the first decades of the Cold War.

Romulus had been built as Spica, a torpedo boat for Italy's Regia Marina, and the lead ship of her class. She was built in the mid-1930s and sold to Sweden in 1940. The ship served in the Royal Swedish Navy until she was stricken in 1958.

Notes

References
 
 Robert Gardner, Conway's All the World's Fighting Ships 1922–1946 (1980) Conway Publishing :

External links
 Spica Marina Militare website

Romulus, HSwMS